Ranaghan is a townland and archaeological site in County Westmeath, Ireland.

Introduction
It is south-west of Lough Lene on high ground where there are a multitude of ringforts. Randoon (Randún), possibly the most famous fort of the area, is between Castlepollard and Collinstown. Turgesius the Viking is believed to have governed and sojourned in this area.

Origins
Ringforts are fortified settlements, generally agreed to be from the Early Medieval Period in Northern Europe, especially Ireland. They are also known as ráth (as in Ranaghan) caiseal, cathair and dún (as in Randoon/Randún) in the early Irish sources. A ráth (anglicised rath) was made of earth; caiseal (northwestern Ireland, anglicised cashel) and cathair (southwestern Ireland) were built of stone. A dún is a more prestigious site, the seat of a local chieftain or ruler; the term is also applied to promontory forts.

Locations
No historical or archaeological maps, surveys, nor records of the Early Medieval Period in Ireland approach the dates of the Irish ringforts. The areas surrounding Lough Lene (meaning "fertile soil") of Collinstown, Glenidan, Comerstown, Ranaghan, are dotted with ringforts, testifying to the land of fertile soil.

See also
 Grianan of Aileach
 Hill of Tara
 Turgesius

Further reading
 
  
 "...Randún - a hill overlooking Lough Lene Collinstown W.Meath...", recorded by K. Molloy, found in the Glenidan Schools' Collection of the National Folklore Collection, UCD (recognised as one of Europe’s largest archives of oral tradition and cultural history, and inscribed in 2017 to the UNESCO Memory of the World Register),  www.duchas.ie
 "...From the top of it can be seen three forts Ran Dún, on the northern side, one on the western side and one on the southern side..." recorded in 1938 by Dómhnaill De Bhealatúin, found in the Collinstown Schools’ Collection of the National Folklore Collection, UCD (recognised as one of Europe’s largest archives of oral tradition and cultural history, and inscribed in 2017 to the UNESCO Memory of the World Register), www.duchas.ie

External links
 The Modern Antiquarian: Website containing further information
 Megalithic: Website containing a Layout and Description

Medieval Ireland
Forts in Ireland
Archaeological sites in County Westmeath
Townlands of County Westmeath
Former populated places in Ireland